The Australian Army and its forerunners have been awarded 248 battle and theatre honours since its formation. The first honour given to an Australian unit came prior to Federation and was awarded to forces from the colony of New South Wales, which contributed a small contingent consisting of an infantry battalion, with artillery and support units to take part in the short-lived British campaign against the Dervish revolt in the eastern Sudan in 1885 following the death of General Charles Gordon at Khartoum.

The next conflict that saw Australian units receive battle or theatre honours was the Second Boer War. Between 1899 and 1901, forces from the six Australian colonies fought alongside each other before being replaced in 1901 by forces of the newly established Australian Army following Federation. A total of five theatre honours were awarded for service in South Africa, being bestowed upon successor units in the form of honorary banners and distinctions presented in 1904, 1908 and 1911. Since then, the Australian Army has received honours for fighting during the First World War, the Second World War, the Korean War and the Vietnam War, with the Royal Australian Regiment last being awarded a battle honour in 1994 for the First Battle of Maryang San in Korea. In 2013, units of Special Operations Command were awarded the battle honour Eastern Shah Wali Kot for their actions in Afghanistan in May and June 2010. A theatre honour for peacekeeping in East Timor in 1999–2003 was awarded to the Army on its 119th birthday in March 2020.
The most highly decorated unit in the Australian Army are The 1st/15th Royal New South Wales Lancers, with 21 battle honours. They are an active Australian Army Reserve Cavalry regiment. It celebrated its centenary in 1985. The regiment has its headquarters at Lancer Barracks in Parramatta, a suburb in Western Sydney, New South Wales. Lancer Barracks is the oldest Military Barracks on mainland Australia and dates from 1819.

Sudan (1885)
 Suakin 1885

South Africa (1899–1902)
 South Africa 1899–1902
 South Africa 1899–1900
 South Africa 1900–1902
 South Africa 1901–1902
 South Africa 1902

First World War (1914–18)

German New Guinea

 Herbertshöhe

Gallipoli

 Helles
 Krithia
 Anzac
 Landing at Anzac
 Defence of Anzac
 Suvla
 Sari Bair – Lone Pine
 Gallipoli 1915

Egypt

 Suez Canal
 Rumani
 Magdhaba – Rafah
 Egypt 1915–17

Palestine

 Gaza – Beersheba
 El Mughar
 Nebi Samwil
 Jerusalem
 Jaffa
 Jericho
 Jordan (Es Salt)
 Jordan (Amman)
 Megiddo
 Sharon
 Nablus
 Damascus
 Palestine 1917–18

Western Front

 Somme 1916
 Pozières
 Bapaume 1917
 Arras 1917
 Bullecourt
 Messines 1917
 Ypres 1917
 Menin Road
 Polygon Wood
 Broodseinde
 Poelcappelle
 Passchendaele
 Somme 1918
 Arras 1918
 Avre
 Ancre 1918
 Villers-Bretonneux
 Lys
 Hazebrouck
 Kemmel
 Hamel
 Marne 1918
 Tardenois
 Amiens
 Albert 1918 (Chuignes)
 Mont St Quentin
 Hindenburg Line
 Epehy
 St Quentin Canal
 Beaurevoir
 France and Flanders 1916–1918

Second World War (1939–45)

North Africa

 North Africa 1940–42
 Bardia 1941
 Capture of Tobruk
 Derna
 Giarabub
 Er Regima
 Defence of Tobruk
 El Adem Road
 The Salient 1941
 Tobruk 1941
 Belhamed
 Defence of Alamein Line
 Tel el Eisa
 Ruweisat Ridge
 Tell el Makh Khad
 Sanyet et Miteirya
 Qattara Track
 Alam el Halfa
 West Point 23
 El Alamein

Greece

 Greece 1941
 Mount Olympus
 Servia Pass
 Tempe Gorge
 Veve
 Soter
 Brailos Pass

Middle East

 Middle East 1941
 Crete
 Canea
 Heraklion
 Retimo
 42nd Street
 Withdrawal to Sphakia

Syria

 Syria 1941
 Syrian Frontier
 The Litani
 Merjayun
 Adlun
 Sidon
 Jezzine
 Damascus (1941)
 Wadi Zeini
 Dimas
 Chehim and Rharife
 Damour
 Mazraat ech Chouf
 Hill 1069
 Badarene
 Jebel Mazar

Malaya

 Malaya 1941–42
 Johore
 Gemas
 The Muar
 Jemaluang
 Singapore Island

South West Pacific

 South West Pacific 1942
 South West Pacific 1942–43
 South West Pacific 1942–44
 South West Pacific 1942–45
 South West Pacific 1943
 South West Pacific 1943–44
 South West Pacific 1943–45
 South West Pacific 1944–45
 South West Pacific 1945
 Koepang
 Ambon
 Laha
 Rabaul
 Java 1942
 Kokoda Trail
 Kokoda – Deniki
 Isurava
 Eora Creek – Templeton's Crossing I
 Efogi – Menari
 Ioribaiwa
 Eora Creek – Templeton's Crossing II
 Oivi – Gorari
 Buna – Gona
 Gona
 Sanananda Road
 Amboga River
 Cape Endaiadere – Sinemi Creek
 Sanananda – Cape Killerton
 Milne Bay
 Goodenough Island
 Wau
 Mubo I
 Bobdubi I
 Lababia Ridge
 Bobdubi II
 Nassau Bay
 Mubo II
 Mount Tambu
 Tambu Bay
 Komiatum
 Lae – Nadzab
 Busu River
 Lae Road
 Finschhafen
 Scarlet Beach
 Bumi River
 Defence of Scarlet Beach
 Jivenaneng – Kumawa 
 Siki Cove
 Sattelberg
 Pabu
 Gusika
 Wareo
 Nongora
 Liberation of Australian New Guinea
 Ramu Valley
 Shaggy Ridge
 Finisterres
 Barum
 Bogadjim
 Madang
 Kalueng River
 Wareo – Lakona
 Gusika – Fortification Point
 Sio
 Sio – Sepik River
 Matapau
 Perembil
 Abau – Malin
 Nambut Ridge
 Balif
 Anumb River
 But – Dagua
 Maprik
 Hawain River
 Wewak
 Wirui Mission
 Mount Shiburangu – Mount Tazaki
 Yamil – Ulupu
 Kaboibus – Kiarivu
 Tsimba Ridge
 Bonis – Porton
 Artillery Hill
 Pearl Ridge
 Adele River
 Mawaraka
 Mosigetta
 Puriata River
 Darara
 Slater's Knoll
 Hongorai River
 Egan's Ridge–Hongorai Ford
 Commando Road
 Hari River
 Ogorata River
 Mobiai River
 Mivo River
 Mivo Ford
 Waitavolo
 Borneo
 Tarakan
 Brunei
 Labuan
 Beaufort
 Miri
 Balikpapan
 Milford Highway

Korea (1950–53)

 Sariwon
 Yongyu
 Chongju
 Pakchon
 Uijeongbu
 Chuam-ni
 Maehwa-San
 Kapyong
 Kowang-San
 Maryang-San
 The Samichon
 Korea 1950–53

Vietnam (1962–72)

 Long Tan
 Bien Hoa
 Coral–Balmoral
 Hat Dich
 Binh Ba
 Vietnam 1965–72
 Vietnam 1968–72

East Timor (1999–2003)
 East Timor 1999–2003

Afghanistan (07/08/2001 – 30/08/2021)
 Eastern Shah Wali Kot

Iraq (20 March 2003 – 15 December 2011)
 Iraq

See also

 Battle honours of the British and Imperial Armies

Notes
Footnotes

Citations

References

Further reading

External links
 Australian Army Pre 1980 Battle Honours by conflict

Battle honours of the Australian Army
Australian military-related lists